The 1996–97 Slovak 1.Liga season was the fourth season of the Slovak 1. Liga, the second level of ice hockey in Slovakia. 12 teams participated in the league, and HKm Zvolen won the championship.

Regular season

Qualification round

External links
 Season on hockeyarchives.info

Slovak 1. Liga
Slovak 1. Liga seasons
Liga